Isle-aux-Grues Airport  is an airport  northeast of Isle-aux-Grues, Quebec, Canada.

Airlines and destinations

References

Certified airports in Chaudière-Appalaches